"F-150" is a song co-written and recorded by Canadian country artist Robyn Ottolini. The track was co-written with Erik Fintelman and Mark Schroor, who also co-produced the track. After achieving viral success on the media platform TikTok, "F-150" became Ottolini's debut single on Warner Music Nashville to country radio formats in the United States and Canada.

Background
"F-150" was originally released in January 2020, and was later included on her independent release The I'm Not Always Hilarious EP. Ottolini described the meaning of the song: 

The song began to gain traction on TikTok in the Fall of 2020 and reached #3 on the Rolling Stone Trending 25 in the United States. This led to her signing with Warner Music Nashville in October 2020.

Critical reception
Billy Dukes of Taste of Country called "F-150" an "emotionally satisfying earworm" with "radio-friendly appeal". Chet Daniels of 99.9 WJVL called the song a "standout track", while Complete Country said "The song has a relatable message to those trying to get over someone, and the catchy lyrics and chorus make it hard to get out of your head."

Accolades

Commercial performance 
"F-150" reached a peak of number eight on the Billboard Canada Country chart, and #65 on the Canadian Hot 100, marking Ottolini's first entry on both charts. It is also Ottolini's first single to be certified Gold by Music Canada and was later certified Platinum. In the United States, "F-150" debuted at number 59 on the Country Airplay chart.

Music video
The music video for "F-150" was directed by Ben Knechtel, and premiered on December 4, 2020.

Charts

Certifications

Notes

References

2020 songs
2021 singles
Robyn Ottolini songs
Warner Records singles
Warner Records Nashville singles